Nong Bunnak is a tambon (sub-district) of Nong Bun Mak District, Nakhon Ratchasima Province, northeastern Thailand.

History
Originally, Nong Bun Mak was a sub-district belonging to Chok Chai District in the name of "Saraphi". On July 1, 1983, the Ministry of Interior was established Saraphi Sub-district into a minor-district named "King Amphoe Nong Bun Mak".

Nong Bun Mak District is divided into nine administrative sub-districts, Nong Bunnak is also one of them.

The literal translation of Nong Bunnak is 'Ceylon ironwood [Bunnak] marsh [Nong]', as its area in the past, there were many this species of plants around the marsh.

Geography

Adjacent sub-districts are (from the north clockwise): Thai Charoen in its district, Bu Krasang in Nong Ki District of Buriram Province, Suk Phaibun in Soeng Sang District, and Nong Takai in its district.

Administration

Central administration
The entire area is administered by the Subdistrict Administrative Organization (SAO) Nong Bunnak (อบต.หนองบุนนาก).

Local administration

Nong Bunnak also consists of 17 administrative muban (village)

Public utilities
Most of the people in Nong Bunnak are Buddhists with 10 places of worship, consists of six Buddhist temples and four houses of monk.

There are two health promotion hospitals in the area.

Nong Bunnak has three child development centres, one primary school, three junior secondary schools.

References

External links
 

Tambon of Nakhon Ratchasima Province